The Confederate Monument in Oxford, Mississippi is installed on the University of Mississippi campus. It was designed by John Stinson and installed in 1907. The monument is being relocated in 2019.

See also
 1907 in art
 List of Confederate monuments and memorials in Mississippi

References

1907 establishments in Mississippi
1907 sculptures
Confederate States of America monuments and memorials in Mississippi
Outdoor sculptures in Mississippi
Buildings and structures at the University of Mississippi